Fausta Quintavalla (born 4 May 1959 in Montechiarugolo, Parma) is a former javelin thrower from Italy. She won three medals, at senior level, at the International athletics competitions.

Biography
Quintavalla set her personal best in 1983, throwing 67.20 metres. She competed for her native country twice at the Summer Olympics (1980 and 1984). Her best Olympic finish was the twelfth place in Moscow, USSR (1980). She has 41 caps in national team from 1976 to 1991.

Achievements

National titles
Fausta Quintavalla has won 8 times consecutively the individual national championship.
8 wins in javelin throw (1979, 1980, 1981, 1982, 1983, 1984, 1986, 1990)

See also
 Italian all-time lists - Javelin throw

References

External links
 

1959 births
Living people
Italian female javelin throwers
Athletes (track and field) at the 1980 Summer Olympics
Athletes (track and field) at the 1984 Summer Olympics
Olympic athletes of Italy
Sportspeople from Parma
Universiade medalists in athletics (track and field)
World Athletics Championships athletes for Italy
Mediterranean Games silver medalists for Italy
Mediterranean Games medalists in athletics
Athletes (track and field) at the 1979 Mediterranean Games
Athletes (track and field) at the 1983 Mediterranean Games
Universiade silver medalists for Italy
Medalists at the 1983 Summer Universiade